Orquesta Paris de Noia is a band from Galicia that performs throughout the Iberian Peninsula. It is commonly referred as one of the best Orquestas along with, Orquesta Panorama, Combo Dominicano, and Orquesta Olympus. As of April 2018 they were ranked number two of all orquestas according to the Orquestas de Galicia website.

History
They were founded in 1957 by Joaquín García Piñeiro. He set up an eleven-man Orquesta that included Constantino Pego, who was a famous singer at the time. The Orquesta went through various changes to appeal to different audiences. A notable change occurred in the 1980s when they started focusing on pop and rock in order to gain a younger fan base. Nowadays the Orquesta has sixteen artists on stage and a crew of twelve in charge of backstage activities. They have had famous names such as Miguel Ángel y Quin García, José Somoza, Arturo Solar, Emilio Solar, Moncho Ces, Manuel Bandin, Miro Lamas, Juan Léis, Leandro Cruz, Fernando Resúa, David Barciela Oscar Rodil, Manuel Brey, Carlos Bastón perform on their stage.

Artists

Genma Lareo Vieites--singer 2008–present
Fátima Pego Vilas--singer 2012–2018
Lucia Sanchez--singer 2019–2022
José Antonio Blas Piñón--singer 1981–present
Sergio Corral--singer 2010–present
Oliver Pérez Escobar--singer 2017–present
Zeus RB--singer 2017–2022
Héctor Bordón--dancer 2013–present
Boris Jeyko Rodríguez--dancer 2017–present
Janet Perez--bass guitarist unknown
Diego Moreira Villanueva--guitarist 2014–2021
Joseph Ludwing Ruiz Zuluaga--keyboardist 2008–2022
Daniel Zaldívar--battery 2017–present
Marcos Luis Valcárcel Laguna--percussionist unknown
Juan Cuñarro Otero--saxophonist 2016–2022
Juan Carlos Betancourt Rosabal--trumpeter 2014–present
Jorge Denis Lapera--trumpeter 2017–present
edwar machado --trompetist 2008–2022

References

Musical groups established in 1957